Mike Busch (born 5 April 1981) is a German football forward.

References

External links
 

1981 births
Living people
German footballers
VfL Wolfsburg players
VfL Wolfsburg II players
VfL Bochum players
VfL Bochum II players
2. Bundesliga players
Association football forwards